Niko Ojamäki (born 17 June 1995) is a Finnish professional ice hockey player for Tappara of the Liiga.

Playing career
Ojamäki made his Liiga debut playing with Ässät during the 2013–14 Liiga season.

After establishing himself in the Liiga through four seasons with Ässät, Ojamäki left following the 2016–17 season, to sign an initial two-year contract with Tappara on May 29, 2017.

Ojamäki played the 2020–21 season with Linköping HC of the Swedish Hockey League (SHL), collecting 5 goals and 16 points in 48 regular season games. Leaving Sweden as a free agent, Ojamäki moved to the KHL, agreeing to a one-year deal with Russian based, HC Vityaz, on 21 May 2021.

On 23 June 2022, Ojamäki returned to the Liiga signing a one-year contract with former club, Tappara.

Career statistics

Regular season and playoffs

International

References

External links

1995 births
Living people
Ässät players
Finnish ice hockey right wingers
Linköping HC players
Ice hockey players at the 2022 Winter Olympics
Olympic ice hockey players of Finland
Medalists at the 2022 Winter Olympics
Olympic gold medalists for Finland
Olympic medalists in ice hockey
Tappara players
HC Vityaz players
Sportspeople from Pori